Waddell Creek is a stream in Thurston County in the U.S. state of Washington. It is a tributary to the Black River.

Waddell Creek was named after the family of Robert Waddell, which settled near its course in the 1850s.

References

Rivers of Thurston County, Washington
Rivers of Washington (state)